Mihailo is a South Slavic masculine given name. It is a variant of the Hebrew name Michael, and its cognates include Mihajlo and Mijailo. Common as a given name among Serbs, it is an uncommon surname.

Notable people with the name include:

 Mihailo Vojislavljević (–d. 1081)), King of Duklja
 Mihailo Ovčarević, Habsburg Serb commander
 Mihailo Đurić (b. 1925), Serbian philosopher, retired professor, and academic
 Mihailo Janković (d. 1976), Serbian architect
 Mihailo Jovanović (b. 1975), Serbian footballer
 Mihailo Lalić (1914–1992), Montenegrin and Serbian novelist
 Mihailo Marković (1927-2010), Serbian philosopher
 Mihailo Merćep (1864–1937), Serb flight pioneer
 Mihailo Obrenović (1823–1868), Prince of Serbia
 Mihailo Petrović Alas (1868–1943), Serbian mathematician and inventor
 Mihailo Petrović (Chetnik) (1871-1941), Serbian archpriest and freedom fighter
 Mihailo Vukdragović (1900–1967), Serbian composer and conductor
 Miraš Dedeić or Metropolitan Mihailo (b. 1938), head of the uncanonical Montenegrin Orthodox Church
 Mihailo Tolotos, Greek monk who lived 82 years not seeing a woman

See also
 Mihailović

References

Given names
Serbian masculine given names